is a Japanese football player. He last played for ReinMeer Aomori.

Playing career
Manabu Minami joined to Amitie SC in 2010. In 2013, he moved to YSCC Yokohama. In 2016, he moved to ReinMeer Aomori.

References

External links

Profile at ReinMeer Aomori

1988 births
Living people
Ritsumeikan University alumni
People from Kashihara, Nara
Association football people from Nara Prefecture
Japanese footballers
J3 League players
Japan Football League players
Ococias Kyoto AC players
YSCC Yokohama players
ReinMeer Aomori players
Association football goalkeepers